Eupithecia jezonica is a moth in the  family Geometridae. It is found in Asia, including India and Nepal. It has also been recorded from Kazakhstan, the Russian Far East and Korea, Japan and Taiwan.

The wingspan is about 20 mm. The forewings are coppery brown, although at the base (except the costa) and in the cell whitish, scattered with black scales. The hindwings have about six obsolete fuscous bands.

References

Moths described in 1927
jezonica
Moths of Asia
Taxa named by Shōnen Matsumura